François Élie Roudaire (born 6 August 1836 in Gueret and deceased 14 January 1885 in Gueret) was a French author, military officer and geographer. He, along with Ferdinand de Lesseps, was a proponent of creating an inland Sahara Sea by flooding areas of the Sahara Desert which were below sea level.

Early life and military career

Roudaire was born into a middle-class family. His father, François Joseph Roudaire, was director of the Natural History Museum of Gueret. After classical studies in his hometown, François Élie turned towards a scientific career in the army. He entered the Ecole Spéciale Militaire de Saint-Cyr in 1854. In 1864, he was assigned to Algeria as an officer surveyor, given the task of creating a geodesic and topographic survey of the colony. Operating south of Biskra, in Constantine Province, he explored the region's chotts, and was one of the first to accurately measure their depth, noting that many lay below sea level.

Proposal of a Sahara Sea

Having discovered many locations far below sea level (up to ), Roudaire became convinced that a vast depression once extended to the salty Gulf of Gabès and corresponded to a geographic feature known at the time of Herodotus as Lake Tritonis (also known as the Bay of Triton). In an article written for the Revue des Deux Mondes in 1874, titled "An inland sea in Algeria," François Élie Roudaire proposed to recreate the former sea by cutting a channel from the Chott el Fejej to the Gulf of Gabès. He argued that the mass of water would allow water transport, as well as significantly alter the climate; it would turn the arid region of the Sahara into one of considerably greater fertility. Ferdinand de Lesseps, who was instrumental in the creation of the Suez Canal, adopted the idea along with several other writers, scholars and politicians.

While there was initially general enthusiasm for the project, further surveys discovered that one of the chotts that Roudaire and de Lesseps had proposed digging a canal to was, in fact, above sea level. Roudaire and Ferdinand de Lesseps fell back on private funding and founded the Society for the Study of African inland sea later that year to continue their pursuit of the project. Criticism of the project from within the scientific community mounted, however, and the project was abandoned shortly before Roudaire's death in 1885.

Decorations

First class medal awarded by the International Geographical Congress (11 August 1875)
Grade Officer of the Legion of Honour (6 October 1875)
Grade Officer of Public Instruction (28 August 1876)
Gold Medal of the Geographical Society (March 1877)
Great Medal of Honor Society (March 1877)

Publications

Premier rapport sur la mission des chotts publié par l'instruction publique (January 1877)
Deuxième rapport sur les missions des chotts publié par l'instruction publique (January 1881)
La mer intérieure africaine (September 1883)

Portrayals in literature

Jules Verne, Invasion of the Sea (1905).

Footnotes

Other references

Gérard Dubost, Le colonel Roudaire et son projet de mer saharienne, éd. Société des sciences naturelles et archéologiques de la Creuse, Guéret, 1998
René Létolle et Hocine Bendjoudi, Histoires d'une mer au Sahara : utopies et politiques, coll. Écologie et agronomie appliquée, éd. L'Harmattan, Paris, 1997
Jean-Louis Marçot, Une mer au Sahara, éd. La Différence, Paris, 2003

People from Guéret
French Army officers
French surveyors
French topographers
French geographers
1836 births
1885 deaths